Renzo Marignano (26 March 1923 - 25 November 1987), sometimes credited as Renzo Marignani, was an Italian actor and film director.

Born in Genoa, after World War II Marignano was one of the founders of Cimofilm, a production company specialized in documentaries, some of which he also directed. In 1958 he moved to Rome where he started a career as character actor, appearing in a large number of films.  He also was assistant director for several films by Pietro Germi and Mario Monicelli.

Selected filmography

 Divorce Italian Style (1961) - Politician
 La vita agra (1964) - Swiss man (uncredited)
 Countersex (1964) - (segment "Cocaina di domenica") (uncredited)
 Made in Italy (1965) - The Snob (segment "1 'Usi e costumi', episode 1")
 Pleasant Nights (1966) - Friend of Luca
 Fantabulous Inc. (1967) - The Director of Commercial
 Caprice Italian Style (1968) - L'automobilista (segment "Perche"?") / Principe consorte (segment "Viaggio di lavoro")
 Operation Snafu (1970)
 Il trapianto (1970) - The tall Envoy of the Weisses-Kreuz Klinik
 The Divorce (1970) - Marco
 Dorian Gray (1970) - Pornografic Editor (uncredited)
 Brancaleone at the Crusades (1970) - Finogamo
 Belle d'amore (1970) - Industriale (uncredited)
 The Blonde in the Blue Movie (1971) - Gustav Larsen
 That's How We Women Are (1971) - Guest of Alberta with recorder (segment "Il mondo cammina")
 Four Flies on Grey Velvet (1971) - Funeral Exhibition Attendant (uncredited)
 Il provinciale (1971) - Friend of Giulia
 Without Family (1972) - Cesare Maccaresi (uncredited)
 Seven Murders for Scotland Yard (1972) - Inspector Henry Campbell
 Alfredo, Alfredo (1972) - The Doctor
 Life Is Tough, Eh Providence? (1972) - The Priest
 Fiorina la vacca (1972) - Man of Beolco
 Canterbury n° 2 - Nuove storie d'amore del '300 (1973) - Innkeeper (uncredited)
 We Want the Colonels (1973) - Lt. Commander Teofilo Branzino
 Dirty Weekend (1973) - Franco
 Ming, ragazzi! (1973)
 My Darling Slave (1973) - Corrado
 Mean Frank and Crazy Tony (1973) - Receiver
 Il brigadiere Pasquale Zagaria ama la mamma e la polizia (1973) - Under-secretary
 Patroclooo! E il soldato Camillone, grande grosso e frescone (1973) - Colonnello
 Amore e ginnastica (1973) - Giulio, suo padre
 The Visitor (1974) - Sonia's Father
 Il colonnello Buttiglione diventa generale (1974) - Generale John Ernest Dunn
 Il domestico (1974) - Giacomo
 Il trafficone (1974) - Count Everardo
 La bellissima estate (1974) - Pietro - the chauffeur
 Sex Pot (1975) - Client of nightclub
 The Teasers (1975) - Professor Mancinelli
 Il gatto mammone (1975) - Urologist
 Eye of the Cat (1975) - Dinner Guest (uncredited)
 Rudeness (1975)
 The Loves and Times of Scaramouche (1976) - Barber client
 Il comune senso del pudore (1976) - 'Lady Chatterley' director
 The Con Artists (1976) - Tailor
 Due sul pianerottolo (1976)
 Death Rage (1976) - Doctor
 Goodnight, Ladies and Gentlemen (1976) - TV Reporter in Milan (uncredited)
 Colpita da improvviso benessere (1976)
 Charleston (1977) - Morris
 Three Tigers Against Three Tigers (1977) - Il Marito Di Giada Nardi
 La presidentessa (1977) - Scottish Tourist
 Concorde Affaire '79 (1979) - Martinez - Milland's Advisor
 Le Guignolo (1980) - Le bijoutier
 Cannibal Apocalypse (1980) - Dr. Morris (uncredited)
 Sugar, Honey and Pepper (1980)
 Le cadeau (1982)
 Yuppies (1986) - Husband of Francesca
 Grandi magazzini (1986)
 Dark Eyes (1987) - Il generale (final film role)

References

External links 
 

1923 births
Film people from Genoa
1987 deaths
Italian film directors
Italian male film actors
20th-century Italian male actors
Actors from Genoa